Calliostoma megaloprepes is a species of medium-sized sea snail, a marine gastropod mollusc in the family Calliostomatidae.

Some authors place this taxon in the subgenus Calliostoma (Maurea) .

Description
The height of the shell attains 40 mm.

Distribution
This marine species occurs off New Zealand.

References

 Marshall, 1995. A revision of the recent Calliostoma species of New Zealand (Mollusca:Gastropoda:Trochoidea). The Nautilus 108(4):83-127

Further reading 
 Powell A. W. B., New Zealand Mollusca, William Collins Publishers Ltd, Auckland, New Zealand 1979 

megaloprepes
Gastropods of Australia
Gastropods described in 1948